Great Slump may refer to:

 Great Depression, a dramatic, worldwide economic downturn beginning in the late 1920s and lasting through the 1930s
 Great Slump (15th century), a dramatic economic downturn in England from the 1430s to the 1480s
 Lost Decade (Japan), a period of economic stagnation in Japan following the Japanese asset price bubble's collapse in late 1991 and early 1992

See also
The Great Depression (disambiguation)